The 1988 Northern California Open was a tennis tournament played on outdoor hard courts in Aptos, California in the United States and was part of Tier V of the 1988 WTA Tour. The tournament ran from July 25 through July 31, 1988.

Winners

Women's singles

 Sara Gomer defeated  Robin White 6–4, 7–5
 It was Gomer's only title of the year and the 1st of her career.

Women's doubles

 Lise Gregory /  Ronni Reis defeated  Patty Fendick /  Jill Hetherington 6–3, 6–4
 It was Gregory's only title of the year and the 2nd of her career. It was Reis' only title of the year and the 3rd of her career.

Northern California Open
Northern California Open (tennis)